St. Barnabas, Inham Nook is a parish church in the Church of England in Chilwell, Nottinghamshire.

History

St Barnabas, Inham Nook, stands at the top of Inham Road, at the western end of the parish of Chilwell. It was opened in 1957 as a daughter church of Christ Church, Chilwell, to serve a new housing estate, Inham Nook, built after the Second World War II.
The building on the site today was originally intended as a church hall, with a large open space left adjoining Inham Road for the church.
It became clear that funding would not be available for a new church, and at various times in the past fifty years the building has been modified to provide suitable church and community facilities. A major extension completed in 1999 has converted the building into a main hallway, used as a church and, during the week, community area (with shutters to close off the sanctuary), and rooms, a kitchen and modern toilet facilities to provide space for additional church and community activities.

Sources
The Buildings of England, Nottinghamshire, Nikolaus Pevsner

Churches completed in 1957
20th-century Church of England church buildings
Inham Nook